This article provides details of international football games played by the Burkina Faso national football team from 2000 to 2019.

Results

2000

2001

2002

2003

2004

2005

2006

2007

2008

2009

2010

2011

2012

2013

2014

2015

2016

2017

2018

2019

References

Burkina Faso national football team
2000s in Burkinabé sport
2010s in Burkinabé sport